In Missouri folklore, the Beaman Monster is an entity named after the town of Beaman. Legends about the monster vary; some describe the creature as the spawn of a 12-foot-tall gorilla said to have escaped from a circus train, whereas others describe the monster as "shaped like a wolf or coyote". 

Tales regarding the Beaman Monster have been told for generations in the Sedalia area. One person from Beamon says the legend dates back to the 1900s.

References

Missouri folklore
American legendary creatures